The Peabody-Williams House is a historic house at 7 Norman Road in Newton, Massachusetts.  The -story wood-frame house was built in 1891, and is one of the finest Shingle style houses in the Newton Highlands area, with the asymmetrical massing, gabled projections and dormers, and corner turret typical of the style.  It was designed by J. Williams Beal, and features extensive interior carving work by a locally prominent woodcarver, Andrew Lees.

The house was listed on the National Register of Historic Places in 1986.

See also
 National Register of Historic Places listings in Newton, Massachusetts

References

Houses on the National Register of Historic Places in Newton, Massachusetts
Queen Anne architecture in Massachusetts
Houses completed in 1891
Shingle Style houses
Shingle Style architecture in Massachusetts